Pétur Sigurðsson is the name of:

 Pétur Sigurðsson (athlete) (1928–2002), Icelandic Olympic sprinter
 Pétur Sigurðsson (1911–1998), former director of the Icelandic Coast Guard
 Pétur Sigurðsson (1928–1996), Icelandic Independence Party Party Member of Alþingi
 Pétur Már Sigurðsson (born 1978), Icelandic basketball player and coach